Josselyn & Taylor was an architectural firm in Iowa.

Eugene Hartwell Taylor (1853–1924) was associated with the firm from 1882 to 1924.  Taylor was an 1876 graduate of Grinnell College and also studied at Massachusetts Institute of Technology.

A number of its works are listed on the National Register of Historic Places.

Works include (with attribution):
Agriculture Hall, Iowa State University Ames, IA (Josselyn & Taylor), NRHP-listed
Carnegie Library, Cedar Rapids, built 1905, that is now part of Cedar Rapids Museum of Art, per List of Carnegie libraries in Iowa
Brucemore, 2160 Linden Dr. SE, Cedar Rapids, Iowa, a site of the National Trust for Historic Preservation built between 1884 and 1886 by widow Caroline Sinclair
Lewis Hotel, 231 W. Main St. Cherokee, IA (Josselyn and Taylor), NRHP-listed
Lisbon United Methodist Church, 200 E. Market St. Lisbon, IA (Josselyn & Taylor), NRHP-listed
Morrill Hall, Morrill Rd., facing E toward central campus, Iowa St. University Ames, IA (Josselyn & Taylor), NRHP-listed
One or more works in Mount Vernon Commercial Historic District, 1st St. between 2nd and 1st Aves., N. Mount Vernon, IA (Josselyn and Taylor), NRHP-listed
One or more works in Second and Third Avenue Historic District, 1400 to 1800 blocks of Second Ave. SE and Third Ave. SE Cedar Rapids, IA (Josselyn & Taylor), NRHP-listed
Security Building, built 1908, 2nd Ave. and 2nd St., SE Cedar Rapids, IA (Josselyn & Taylor), NRHP-listed
One or more works in West Branch Commercial Historic District, W. Main and N. Downey Sts. West Branch, IA (Josselyn & Taylor), NRHP-listed
One or more works in the Waterloo East Commercial Historic District, Waterloo, IA

References

Defunct companies based in Iowa
Architecture firms based in Iowa